Chenolea is a genus of flowering plants belonging to the family Amaranthaceae.

Its native range is Southern Africa.

Species:

Chenolea convallis 
Chenolea diffusa

References

Amaranthaceae
Amaranthaceae genera